Platanorrevma is a village located alongside the Pierian Mountains in Servia municipality, Kozani regional unit, in the Greek region of Macedonia. The postal code is 50500, while the telephone code is +30 24640. At the 2011 census the population was 1,004. 

References

Populated places in Kozani (regional unit)